13 Assassins may refer to:

13 Assassins (1963 film), a Japanese film directed by Eiichi Kudo
13 Assassins (2010 film), a Japanese film directed by Takashi Miike